Benjamin Jonah Wolfe is an American jazz bassist who has performed in groups with Wynton Marsalis, Harry Connick Jr., and Diana Krall. He is currently on the teaching faculty at The Juilliard School Jazz Division.

Career
Wolfe was born in Baltimore and raised in Portland, Oregon. He was a member of his high school band, playing tuba and trombone, and a member of pop music groups in which he played bass guitar. In college he started playing double bass, with some lessons from Ray Brown. In the mid-1980s he went to New York City, where he played with Junior Cook, Dakota Staton, and Duke Jordan. He formed a duo with Harry Connick Jr. in 1988 and became a member of Connick's big band. In the early 1990s he toured and recorded with Wynton Marsalis's septet and then became part of Marsalis's Lincoln Center Jazz Orchestra in 1995. He has also played with Wynton's brother, Branford Marsalis, in addition to Frank Kimbrough, Marcus Roberts, and Mary Stallings. In 1997 he went on tour with singer Diana Krall. He has been teaching jazz at The Juilliard School since 2002.

Discography

References

External links

 
Concert review by The New York Times (2008)
Concert review  by All About Jazz (2008)

American jazz double-bassists
Male double-bassists
Educators from Oregon
Juilliard School faculty
Living people
Musicians from Baltimore
Musicians from New York City
Musicians from Portland, Oregon
1962 births
Jazz musicians from New York (state)
Jazz musicians from Maryland
Educators from New York City
21st-century double-bassists
21st-century American male musicians
American male jazz musicians